East Minus West Equals Zero: Russia's Debt to the Western World 862-1962 ( is a 1962 non-fiction book by Werner Keller, a journalist and nonfiction author. The author asserts that all culture and civilization of Russia and Eastern Slavs in general, including political institutions, social order, scientific and technological advances, have their ultimate origin in the Western Civilization and its creative potential. These achievements were culturally imported through imitation, emulation, influence of Western element in Russia (dynastic and demographic) and import of technology and, in contemporary times, industrial espionage. 

The author claims that not a single contribution of science, arts, technology and other aspect of Western civilization has its origin in Russia and that every alleged cultural and scientific achievement of Russia from its late medieval inception to the Space Race has been a copy of prior Western achievements. The book was well received by critics in its era. The book's publication followed short after the erection of the Berlin Wall, which exacerbated the Cold War animosities among the then West German public.

References

1962 non-fiction books
Books about Russia
Books about the Cold War
Anti-Russian sentiment